Michael James Wood (born 3 July 1952) is an English former professional footballer who played as a left back.

Career
Born in Bury, Wood played for Blackburn Rovers, Bradford City, Halifax Town and Dudley Hill Athletic.

Later life
Wood later worked for Bradford City Council Leisure Services as a facility manager, and also as a physiotherapist at the Football Association's Centre of Excellence.

References

1952 births
Living people
Footballers from Bury, Greater Manchester
English footballers
Blackburn Rovers F.C. players
Bradford City A.F.C. players
Halifax Town A.F.C. players
English Football League players
Association football fullbacks